Shri Radha Damodar Temple is a Hindu temple, situated in the Junagadh district of Gujarat, India. The temple is dedicated to the Damodar Hari, another name of Hindu god Krishna. In this temple, Damodar ji is worshiped in his four arms form of Lord Vishnu along with the Goddess Radha who is seated next to him in the central shrine. Within the premises of temple, Damodar kund and Revati kund are also present. This temple comes under the special care of the Government of Gujarat.

Shri Damodar Pilgrimage which includes Shri Radha Damodar temple and its popular lakes - Damodar Kund and Revti Kund, is situated along the road to Girnar mountains. The renovation of this pilgrimage was done in the year 462 A.D during the regime of king Skand Gupta who belongs to Gupta Empire.

Structure 
The main temple is made up of pink sand stone and has two important parts—Nij temple and Saloha Mandap. Peak of Nij temple is 65 feet high and the height of Saloha Mandap’s peak is 30.5 feet. The flag is at the apex of Nij temple. The temple also has 32 arcs and 84 well crafted pillars.

The central shrine of temple is dedicated to Radha and Damodar (Krishna) where Krishna is present in his four hands form of Vishnu holding a conch, discus, mace and lotus in each hand. Adjacent to central shrine, another shrine is present which is dedicated to Lord Balrama and his wife Revati. In the south-west side of the temple there is a temple dedicated Ganesha.

Significance 
Shri Radha Damodar temple is one of the ancient temple of Gujarat. It is believed that temple was built by Vajranabh, grandson of Krishna. The temple is crowded with thousands of devotees on special occasions like 15th day of Krishna paksh of Bhadra month for Pitru Tarpan (paying tribute to deceased ancestors). Devotees also take holy bath in sacred Damodar Kund with the belief of getting salvation post life. In the Skand Upanishad, it is described that the Damodar kund rests in the path of river Swarna Rasha. By bathing in this river, people get rid off their sins. The famous devotional poet Narsinh Mehta also used to bath in Damodar Kund everyday before worshiping Damodar (Krishna).

Temple Timings 
The time zone (UTC+05:30) observed through India by the priest.

Everyday - 6:00 AM to 5:30 PM.

Gallery

See Also 
 Radha Krishna
 Narsinh Mehta
 Damodar Kund
 Dwarkadhish Temple
 Radha Damodar Temple, Vrindavan

References

External Link 
 https://shreeradhadamodarji.org/
Radha Krishna temples
Krishna temples
Hindu temples in Gujarat
Junagadh district